Out of the Blue, also known as OTB, was an American jazz ensemble founded by Blue Note Records in the 1980s as a showcase for the label's younger musicians. The group was formed in 1984, releasing four albums and touring extensively over the next five years. Their most commercially successful album was 1986's Live at Mt. Fuji, which reached #9 on Billboard magazine's Top Jazz Albums chart. The lineup changed occasionally over this time, and the group disbanded in 1989 after its members moved on to solo careers.

Members
Michael Philip Mossman - trumpet
Kenny Garrett - alto saxophone
Ralph Bowen - tenor saxophone
Harry Pickens - piano
Robert Hurst - bass
Ralph Peterson, Jr. - drums
Kenny Davis - bass
Steve Wilson - alto saxophone
Renee Rosnes - piano
Billy Drummond - drums

Discography 
 Out of the Blue (Blue Note, 1985)
 Inside Track (Blue Note, 1986)
 Live at Mt. Fuji (Blue Note, 1987) – live recorded at Mount Fuji Jazz Festival in 1986
 Spiral Staircase (Blue Note, 1989)

References

External links
 Out of the Blue, Blue Note Records

1984 establishments in California
1989 disestablishments in California
American jazz ensembles from California
Blue Note Records artists
Musical groups established in 1984
Musical groups disestablished in 1989